Ralph Rumney (5 June 1934 – 6 March 2002) was an English artist, born in Newcastle Upon Tyne.

In 1957 lifelong conscientious objector Rumney - he evaded National Service by going on the run in continental Europe - was one of the co-founders of the London Psychogeographical Association. This organization was, along with COBRA and the Lettrist International, involved in the formation of the Situationist International. Amongst those present at the founding in the Italian village of Cosio d'Arroscia were Walter Olmo, Michèle Bernstein (later his second wife), Asger Jorn, and Guy Debord. However, within seven months Rumney had been 'amiably' expelled from the SI by Debord for allegedly "failing to hand in a psychogeography report about Venice on time."

Rumney spent much of his life living as a wanderer, and was variously described as both a 'recluse' and a 'media whore', seeing his existence as a 'permanent adventure and endless experiment.' Rumney married Pegeen Guggenheim, the daughter of Peggy Guggenheim. He moved, as his friend Guy Atkins said, "between penury and almost absurd affluence. One visited him in a squalid room in London's Neal Street, in a house shared with near down-and-outs. Next, one would find him in Harry's Bar in Venice, or at a Max Ernst opening in Paris. He seemed to take poverty with more equanimity than riches."

Ralph Rumney died of cancer at his home in Manosque, Provence, France, in 2002, aged 67.

References
 The Map Is Not The Territory by Alan Woods and Ralph Rumney (Manchester University Press) was published in 2001.
 The Consul by Ralph Rumney, a book of interviews conducted by Gérard Berreby (Verso) published in 2002.
 La Vie d'artiste, published in 2010, reproduces several of Rumney's works alongside biographical memoirs by Michèle Bernstein, Guy Atkins, Alison Dunhill and Malcolm Imrie (Editions Allia).

External links
Obituary by guardian.co.uk
Obituary by telegraph.co.uk
1989 interview with Rumney from Art Monthly

1934 births
2002 deaths
Artists from Newcastle upon Tyne
English artists
British conscientious objectors
English conscientious objectors
Situationists
Psychogeographers